The Yantan Ship Lift is a large ship lift located on the Hongshui River, a tributary of the Pearl River in China.
The ship lift's basin can carry vessels of up to 250 tons.
The ship lift's basin is  ×  × .
It lifts vessels .
It is an example of a Vertical Hoist Shiplift.

The ship lift is part of the Yantan Hydroelectric Project, and was completed in 1986.
The dam was built with the assistance of the World Bank.

References

Water transport infrastructure